War on Terror is an Austrian documentary film about the "War on Terror" initiated by U.S. president George W. Bush in 2001. The film features interviews with Manfred Nowak, who was United Nations Special Rapporteur on Torture from 2004 to 2010, Amy Goodman, the host and co-founder of Democracy Now! and the U.S. historian Alfred W. McCoy.
Two former detainees from the Guantanamo Bay detention camp are introduced in the film, Murat Kurnaz and Mustafa Ait Idir.

It was theatrically released in Austria on December 9, 2011.

War on Terror is the third film from Parallel Universe.

See also
War on Terror
United Nations Special Rapporteur
Democracy Now!

References

External links 
 War on Terror
 this human world
 

2011 films
Documentary films about American politics
Austrian documentary films
2011 documentary films
2010s English-language films
2010s American films